Lawrence Caruso is an Australian professional footballer who plays as a goalkeeper for Western Sydney Wanderers NPL.

Playing career

Club

Central Coast Mariners
Caruso was first called up to the Central Coast Mariners' A-League Men squad aged 17, for a game against Macarthur on 5 December 2021, following a suspension to regular goalkeeper Mark Birighitti. Starting on the bench, Caruso was substituted on after only 20 minutes when Birighitti's replacement, Yaren Sözer, was injured. The Mariners lost 1–0, following a deflected own goal from Oliver Bozanic.

References

External links

Living people
Australian soccer players
Association football goalkeepers
Melbourne City FC players
Central Coast Mariners FC players
A-League Men players
2004 births